Erjon Dushku (born 25 February 1985) is an Albanian retired footballer who played in the Albanian Superliga as a central defender. He has represented Albania U17, U19 and U21.

Club career
The Albanian media speculated in 2013 about an offer to Dushku from Kasımpaşa Spor Kulübü, a Turkish club that plays in the Süper Lig.

At the end of the 2014–15 season he left FK Kukësi after his one-year contract with the club had expired.

Clubs statistics

International career
Dushku is a former youth player of Albania national team, collecting four appearances with Albania U21 during 2005–06.

Honours

Clubs
KF Tirana
Albanian Cup (2): 2010–11, 2011–12
Albanian Supercup (2): 2011, 2012

Flamurtari Vlorë
Albanian Cup (1): 2013–14

Notes

References

External links
 
 

1985 births
Living people
People from Lezhë
Association football central defenders
Albanian footballers
KS Kastrioti players
KF Teuta Durrës players
KF Tirana players
Flamurtari Vlorë players
FK Kukësi players
Kategoria Superiore players